Robert Grant VC (1837 – 23 November 1874) was an English recipient of the Victoria Cross, the highest and most prestigious award for gallantry in the face of the enemy that can be awarded to British and Commonwealth forces.

Military service
Grant was approximately 20 years old, and a corporal (subsequently promoted to sergeant) in the 1st Battalion, 5th Regiment of Foot (later The Northumberland Fusiliers), British Army during the Indian Mutiny when the following deed took place at Alumbagh for which he was awarded the VC. The citation was published in The London Gazette of 19 June 1860, and initially Grant was incorrectly named as Ewart, which was corrected in a subsequent Gazette of 12 October 1860. The citation read:

Police service

He later became a constable in the Metropolitan Police, and served in the Y Division Holloway area until his death of what was then commonly known as consumption in 1874. He was buried, at the expense of the parish, in a paupers' grave, number 15054, in Highgate Cemetery, North London. The grave (with modern headstone) lies on the eastern mid-way path just off the main western path.
   
A replica of his Victoria Cross is displayed at the Fusiliers Museum of Northumberland in Alnwick Castle in Northumberland.

In 2007 and 2008 moves were made to properly commemorate both his military and police service with a memorial stone to be unveiled by the head of London's police service, Sir Ian Blair. He is also commemorated in his home town of Harrogate with a plaque at the War Memorial.

References

External links
Image of Fusilier Museum display with tinted photograph of Grant in uniform and his VC medal
Location of grave and VC medal (N. London)

1837 births
1874 deaths
British recipients of the Victoria Cross
Indian Rebellion of 1857 recipients of the Victoria Cross
Royal Northumberland Fusiliers soldiers
Metropolitan Police officers
Burials at Highgate Cemetery
19th-century deaths from tuberculosis
People from Harrogate
British Army recipients of the Victoria Cross
Tuberculosis deaths in England
Military personnel from Yorkshire